Ryu Hye-rin is a South Korean actress and model. She is known for her roles in dramas How Are U Bread, Two Cops and The Game: Towards Zero. She also appeared in movies such as Sunny, Big Match and Familyhood.

Filmography

Television series

Film

Theater

Awards and nominations

References

External links
 
 

1984 births
Living people
21st-century South Korean actresses
South Korean female models
South Korean television actresses
South Korean film actresses
South Korean web series actresses